Mazin is an Arabic given name. Notable people with the name include:

Mazin Elsadig (born 1987), American actor
Mazin Abdellah Hilal Al Farrayeh (born 1969), Jordanian politician
Mazin Fayyadh  (born 1997), Iraqi football player 
Mazin Gilbert, American engineer
Mazin Ahmed Al-Huthayfi (born 1985), Saudi Arabian football player
Mazin Abu Kalal (died 2013), Iraqi politician
Mazin Al-Kasbi (born 1993), Omani football player
Mazin Qumsiyeh (born 1957), Palestinian scientist
Mazin Shooni (born 1961), Iraqi-American three-cushion billiards player

Arabic given names